Weißendorf is a municipality in the district of Greiz, in Thuringia, Germany.

References

Municipalities in Thuringia
Greiz (district)
Principality of Reuss-Gera